The 2019–20 Kosovar Cup is the football knockout competition of Kosovo in the 2019–20 season.

Second round
The draw for the second round was held on 18 November 2019.

Results:

Third round
The draw for the third round was held on 3 December 2019.

Results:

Quarter-finals

The draw for the fourth round was held on 12 December 2019.

Results:

Semifinals
The draw for the fifth round was held on 18 February 2020. Due to COVID-19 pandemic, the semifinal matches were rescheduled for 2 and 3 June, and the return matches were played on 17 June.

First leg

Second leg

Final
Prishtina and the Ballkani will play in the final of the Digital Cup of Kosovo, which is scheduled for 29 July.

References

Kosovar Cup seasons
Kosovo
Cup